Chionaspis is a genus of scale insect. In 2011 geographical sampling and analysis indicated a number of unnamed species in the genus Chionaspis.

Species
 Chionaspis acer (Takagi & Kawai, 1966)
 Chionaspis acericola Hollinger, 1923
 Chionaspis acuta Danzig, 1936
 Chionaspis agonis Fuller, 1897
 Chionaspis agranulata Chen, 1983
 Chionaspis alnus Kuwana, 1928
 Chionaspis americana Johnson, 1896
 Chionaspis angusta Green, 1904
 Chionaspis arkhola Takagi, 1985
 Chionaspis austriaca Lindinger, 1912
 Chionaspis brachycephalon Vea in Vea, Gwiazdowski & Normark, 2013
 Chionaspis broughae Williams & Watson, 1988
 Chionaspis cacti Kuwana & Muramatsu, 1931
 Chionaspis camphora (Chen, 1983)
 Chionaspis candida Green, 1905
 Chionaspis caryae Cooley, 1898
 Chionaspis castanopsidis Takagi, 1985
 Chionaspis caudata Vea in Vea, Gwiazdowski & Normark, 2013
 Chionaspis cinnamomicola (Takahashi, 1935)
 Chionaspis clematidis Takagi, 1985
 Chionaspis comys William & Watson, 1988
 Chionaspis corni Cooley, 1899
 Chionaspis cornigera Takagi, 1985
 Chionaspis discadentata Danzig, 1976
 Chionaspis dryina (Ferris, 1953)
 Chionaspis ethelae Fuller, 1897
 Chionaspis etrusca Leonardi, 1908
 Chionaspis floridensis Takagi, 1969
 Chionaspis formosa Green, 1904
 Chionaspis frenchi Green, 1915
 Chionaspis freycinetiae Williams & Watson, 1988
 Chionaspis furfura (Fitch, 1857)
 Chionaspis gengmaensis (Chen, 1983)
 Chionaspis gilli Liu & Kosztarab, 1987
 Chionaspis gleditsiae Sanders, 1903
 Chionaspis hamoni Liu & Kosztarab, 1987
 Chionaspis heterophyllae Cooley, 1897
 Chionaspis himalaica Takagi, 1985
 Chionaspis kabyliensis Balachowsky, 1930
 Chionaspis keravatana Williams & Watson, 1988
 Chionaspis kosztarabi Takagi and Kawai, 1967
 Chionaspis lepineyi Balachowsky, 1928
 Chionaspis linderae Takahashi, 1952
 Chionaspis lintneri Comstock, 1883
 Chionaspis lithocarpi Takahashi, 1942
 Chionaspis lithocarpicola Takahashi, 1942
 Chionaspis longiloba Cooley, 1889
 Chionaspis lumbiniana Takagi, 1985
 Chionaspis lutea Newstead, 1911
 Chionaspis machillicola (Takahashi, 1935)
 Chionaspis megazygosis Chen, 1983
 Chionaspis montanoides Tang, 1986
 Chionaspis nyssae Comstock, 1881
 Chionaspis obclavata Chen, 1983
 Chionaspis ortholobis Comstock, 1881
 Chionaspis osmanthi (Ferris, 1953)
 Chionaspis pandanicola Williams & Watson, 1988
 Chionaspis pinifoliae (Fitch, 1856)
 Chionaspis platani Cooley, 1889
 Chionaspis pusa Rao, 1953
 Chionaspis ramakrishnai Rao, 1953
 Chionaspis rhaphidophorae Williams & Watson, 1988
 Chionaspis rotunda (Takahashi, 1935)
 Chionaspis saitamaensis Kuwana, 1928
 Chionaspis salicis (Linnaeus, 1758)
 Chionaspis sassceri Cockerell & Robbins, 1909
 Chionaspis sivapuriana Takagi, 1985
 Chionaspis sonorae Vea in Vea, Gwiazdowski & Normark, 2013
 Chionaspis sozanica Takahashi, 1933
 Chionaspis sterculiae Laing, 1932
 Chionaspis styracis Liu & Kosztarab, 1989
 Chionaspis subrotunda (Chen, 1983)
 Chionaspis tangana (Lindinger, 1910)
 Chionaspis torreyanae Vea in Vea, Gwiazdowski & Normark, 2013
 Chionaspis triformis Tippins & Beshear, 1974
 Chionaspis trochodendri (Takahashi, 1936)
 Chionaspis venui Menon & Khan, 1961
 Chionaspis wistariae Cooley, 1897
 Chionaspis xanthorrhoeae Fuller, 1897
 Chionaspis yanagicola (Kuwana & Muramatsu, 1932)

References

Diaspididae
Sternorrhyncha genera